The Haradh Gas Plant is one of the major gas plants in Saudi Arabia. It is located near Haradh village, 300 km southwest of Dhahran. The plant has a capacity of producing 1.6 BSCFD of natural gas and 170,000 BBL/day of condensate (oil). The plant processes only non-associated gas. The plant is considered to be a mid-size, when compared to other sister plants in the region. However, the amount of oil processed is considered to be relatively large. 

The plant started operating in April 2003.

Haradh
Natural gas in Saudi Arabia
Natural gas plants